Daugava National Stadium is a multifunctional stadium in Riga, Latvia, which was first opened in 1927. It holds football and athletics competitions. Since 1992 the Daugava Stadium has been designated as a sports facility of national importance and is owned by the Government of Latvia.

History
The first stadium on the location was built in 1927 and was first operated by the Strādnieku sports un sargs (Worker Sports and Guard, SSS) sports organization affiliated with the Latvian Social Democratic Workers Party. After the stadium had been abandoned after the Soviet occupation of Latvia in 1940 and during, World War II, the stadium was re-established in 1945, with renovation works beginning in 1949. Before July 1990 the total capacity of the stadium was more than 10,000 people, but after the demolition of the north, east and south stands in 1999 it was only 5,683.

The Latvia national football team were playing its home games at the Daugava stadium from 1991 until 2000, when Skonto Stadium was unveiled as a temporary venue while the planned renovation of Daugava Stadium was underway, with the team returning to Daugava in the summer of 2018. The second tenant since June 2018 was FS Metta/LU. Previous tenants have included FC Daugava, FK Daugava 90, JFK Olimps and others.

Two exercise venues under the main stand, tennis and athletics grounds and artificial turf pitches are also a part of the complex. The Latvian Football Federation headquarters were located within the complex from 1991 until 2009, when the offices were moved to the Elektrum Olympic Center. The Daugava Stadium has traditionally hosted the dance performances of the Latvian Song and Dance Festival.

To celebrate the 90th anniversary of the independence of Latvia, on October 19, 2008, a new Guinness World Record was set at the venue for the most people running 100 metres in a 24-hour relay. There were 3,807 participants.

Renovation projects 
The project for the renovation of the stadium received funds from the European Regional Development Fund and the Latvian government in 2015 and the works officially started in September 2017, after a €62 million contract was signed on June 5 for the reconstruction of the stadium and the creation of the Grīziņkalns sports and culture district in its surroundings.

On 15 May 2018, the first phase of the renovation was completed, in the course of which new stands were built on both goal ends, increasing the capacity of the stadium from 5,683 seats to 10,461 seats, the main western stand with its indoor athletics facilities, conference rooms and VIP facilities were fully renovated and a new electronic scoreboard display was installed. After the renovation the stadium now meets UEFA Category 4 and IAAF Category 2 requirements. The second and final phase – during which the construction of a roof over the west terrace, a new ice rink replacing the one built in 1960 (demolished in 2018) and new, multi-functional sports halls is planned – is scheduled to be completed by 2022.

In April 2020 the construction of the new ice arena was started after the final construction permit was issued by the Riga City Council. The deadline for the unveiling of the venue is set for March 2021 in time for the 2021 IIHF World Championship.

References

External links 

 

Football venues in Latvia
Athletics (track and field) venues in Latvia
Multi-purpose stadiums in Latvia
Sport in Riga
Buildings and structures in Riga
Sports venues built in the Soviet Union
1958 establishments in Latvia
Sports venues completed in 1958